Livingston Correctional Facility was a medium security state prison in Sonyea, Livingston County, New York, owned and operated by the New York State Department of Corrections and Community Supervision.    Livingston was opened in 1991, held 881 adult male inmates at medium security level,  and was immediately adjacent to the state's Groveland Correctional Facility.  It was closed on September 1, 2019.

References 

Buildings and structures in Livingston County, New York
Prisons in New York (state)
1991 establishments in New York (state)